Stobart or Stobbart  is an English surname, it may refer to:

People
 Chuck Stobart (born 1934), American footballer
 Dickie Stobbart (1891-1952), Canadian footballer
 Eddie Stobart (born 1929), British businessman, founded Eddie Stobart Group
 Edward Stobart (1954–2011), British businessman
 George Stobbart (1921–1995), English footballer
 J. C. Stobart (John Clarke Stobart, 1878-1933) British classical scholar, the BBC's first Director of Education 
 John Stobart (born 1929), British painter
 Tom Stobart (1914-1980), British mountaineer and photographer, on the 1953 British Everest Expedition
 William Stobart (born 1961), British businessman

Companies
 Logistics Development Group, (formerly Eddie Stobart Logistics), logistics investment company with a 49% interest in Eddie Stobart Group
 Eddie Stobart Group, British multimodal logistics company
 Stobart Rail Freight, division of Eddie Stobart Group
 Stobart Pullman, division of Eddie Stobart Group
 Stobart Motorsport, division of Eddie Stobart Group
 Esken, (formerly Stobart Group), British infrastructure and support services company
 Esken Renewables, division of Esken
London Southend Airport, division of Esken
London Southend Jet Centre, division of Esken
 XYZ Rail & Civils, (formerly Stobart Rail & Civils), division of Bavaria Industries Group

English-language surnames